Dennis O'Keeffe (1939–2014) was Professor of Social Science at the University of Buckingham and editor of the Salisbury Review. He was Education and Welfare Fellow at the Institute of Economic Affairs. In addition, he served on the advisory boards of both the Social Affairs Unit, and FOREST, the smoker's rights campaign. He died on 16 December 2014.

References

Academics of the University of Buckingham
1939 births
2014 deaths
English magazine editors